James (Jim) Woodgett is a British-born biologist and the Principal Investigator of an active research laboratory at the Lunenfeld-Tanenbaum Research Institute, Sinai Health System (formerly Mount Sinai Hospital), in Toronto, Ontario, Canada. He was the Koffler Director of Research at the Lunenfeld-Tanenbaum Research Institute from November 2005 to January 2021.

Woodgett's research spans the fields of Signal Transduction, Cancer Stem Cells, Diabetes, and Neurological Disorders. He is known for his co-discoveries of the molecules PKB/Akt and SAPK/JNKs, which have central roles in the evolution of cancer. Woodgett is also an authority on the functions of the GSK-3 genes, which play significant roles in insulin/diabetes and brain development/Alzheimer's disease, as well as bipolar disorder.

Woodgett is a long-time advocate for increasing public support for science and medical research. He is known for his science communication and public science outreach, as well as his support for Women in STEM and early career researchers.

Woodgett is frequently interviewed by journalists to provide commentary on questions of research relating to health matters, and also medical and science research funding and policy.

Biography 
Jim Woodgett was born in Leicestershire in the United Kingdom, He grew up in the village of Quorn. Encouraged by his mother, he entered the BBC's Inventor of the Year competition and won a runner-up prize.

Woodgett studied biochemistry as an undergraduate at the University of York, before undertaking doctoral research at the University of Dundee, Scotland. He did post-doctoral research in Tony Hunter's group at the Salk Institute for Biological Studies in California. This was followed by five years (1987-1992) at the Ludwig Institute for Cancer Research in Middlesex, England, where he headed his own research laboratory.

In 1992, Woodgett and his family emigrated to Canada from the United Kingdom. He worked at the Ontario Cancer Institute, based at Princess Margaret Hospital. His fellow researchers at the time included Tak Mak and Josef Penninger. Woodgett went on to be appointed head of the division of experimental therapeutics, and director of the Microarray Centre at University Health Network.

In 2005, Woodgett became Director of the Lunenfeld-Tanenbaum Research Institute. He is also a professor of medical biophysics at the University of Toronto.

Research 
Jim Woodgett has (co-)authored over 300 peer-reviewed scientific research articles. In 2007, he was interviewed for the Question and Answer section of the journal Current Biology, about his research and thoughts on being a scientist.

Scientific Community Service and Leadership 
Woodgett is a Member of the Medical Advisory Board of the Gairdner Foundation.

When the CIHR proposed to change the way that it awarded research grants, including replacing the existing face-to-face peer reviews of grant applications with a virtual, anonymous review system, Woodgett wrote an open letter to Federal Health Minister Jane Philpott criticizing the changes. Within days more than 1,300 scientists and researchers had signed on to his letter. Woodgett subsequently met with Minister Philpott on July 13, 2016. While some plans were re-evaluated, Woodgett later told University Affairs magazine that with the next round of research applications looming, the CIHR grant system "is still a mess."

Together with Professor Imogen Coe, the founding Dean of Science at Ryerson University, Woodgett co-organized a one-day conference, held at the end of May 2017 in Toronto, at which researchers came together to discuss, and to support the findings of the Naylor Report: Investing in Canada's Future – Strengthening the Foundations of Canadian Research.

In June 2016, Dr. Kirsty Duncan, then Minister of Science in the Liberal government of Prime Minister Justin Trudeau, commissioned a nine-member advisory panel, chaired by former president of the University of Toronto, Dr. David Naylor, to consult with Canada's research community and to report on the state of basic science and scholarly inquiry in Canada.

Honours and awards 
2000 – Elected Fellow of the Royal Society of Canada in the field of Molecular Biology and Genetics

2018 – Awarded the Arthur Wynne Gold Medal by the Canadian Society for Molecular Biosciences

Selected bibliography 
 John M Kyriakis, Papia Banerjee, Eleni Nikolakaki, Tianang Dai, Elizabeth A Rubie, Mir F Ahmad, Joseph Avruch, James R Woodgett (1994) The stress-activated protein kinase subfamily of c-Jun kinases. Nature 369 (6476): 156–160
 Qi-Long Ying, Jason Wray, Jennifer Nichols, Laura Batlle-Morera, Bradley Doble, James Woodgett, Philip Cohen, Austin Smith (2008) The ground state of embryonic stem cell self-renewal. Nature 453 (7194): 519–523

References

External links 
 Google Scholar 
 Gairdner Foundation Medical Advisory Board
 
 Jim Woodgett on Slideshare
 Lunenfeld-Tanenbaum Research Institute
 Mount Sinai Hospital, Toronto, Canada
 

1960 births
Living people
Alumni of the University of York
Alzheimer's disease researchers
Canadian biochemists
Cancer researchers
English emigrants to Canada
People from Quorn, Leicestershire
Academic staff of the University of Toronto